Tidwell Field is a baseball park located in Granbury, TX and was the home of the Texas Collegiate League Granbury Generals in 2004. It is also the home of the Granbury Pirates baseball team.

References

External links
 Granbury ISD

Baseball venues in Texas